Svirka is a village in Udomelsky District of Tver Oblast, Russia.

In the 19th century, the village was part of Vyshnevolotsky Uyezd, Tver Governorate. In 1859 the village had 19 households with 60 men and 70 women living there.

References

Rural localities in Udomelsky District
Vyshnevolotsky Uyezd